The Bolivian National Congress 1979–1980 was elected on 1 July 1979.

Chamber of Deputies

Chamber of Senators

Presidents of the National Congress

Presidents of the Chamber of Senators

Presidents of the Chamber of Deputies 

 

UDP – Democratic and Popular Union (Unidad Democratica y Popular). Electoral alliance formed by
Nationalist Revolutionary Movement of the Left, MNRI;
Communist Party of Bolivia, PCB;
Revolutionary Left Movement, MIR;
Tupaj Katari Revolutionary Movement, MRTK;
Movement of the National Left, MIN;
Popular Movement for National Liberation, MPLN;
Alliance of the National Left, ALIN;
Revolutionary Party of the Nationalist Left, PRIN;
Revolutionary Workers Party Trotskyist-Posadist, POR-TP;
Socialist Party-Sabino Tito Atahuichi, PS-Atahuichi;
Organization of Revolutionary Unity, OUR;
Center for the Study of Natural Resources, CERNA;
Revolutionary Party of the Workers of Bolivia, PRTB.

MNR-A – Revolutionary Nationalist Movement-Alliance (Movimiento Nacionalista Revolucionario-Alianza). Electoral alliance formed by
Revolutionary Nationalist Movement, MNR;
Tupaj Katari Revolutionary Movement-Chila, MRTK-Chila (faction led by Macabeo Chila);
Communist Party of Bolivia (Marxist–Leninist), PCML;
Christian Democratic Party, PDC;
Revolutionary Party of the National Left – Gueiler, PRIN-G;
Authentic Revolutionary Party, PRA (historical faction led by Walter Guevara Arce).

ADN – Nationalist Democratic Action.

FSB-M – Bolivian Socialist Falange-Moreira (faction led by Gaston Moreira Ostria).

PRA-R – Authentic Revolutionary Party- Ríos (faction led by Jorge Ríos Gamarra).

MNR-J – Revolutionary Nationalist Movement-Julio, (faction led by Rubén Julio Castro).

PS-1 – Socialist Party-One.

APIN – Popular Alliance for National Integration (Alianza Popular de Integración Nacional). Electoral alliance formed by
Revolutionary Agrarian Movement of the Bolivian Peasantry, MARC;
Bolivian Socialist Falange, FSB (faction led by Mario Gutiérrez Gutiérrez);
Christian Democratic Union, UDC.

MITKA – Indian Movement Tupaj Katari.

PUB – Bolivian Union Party.

Notes

Political history of Bolivia